Rocky Miller (born October 22, 1965) is an American politician. who served as a member of the Missouri House of Representatives for the 124th district from 2013 to 2021. He is a member of the Republican Party.

References

Living people
1965 births
Republican Party members of the Missouri House of Representatives
21st-century American politicians